Memaliaj is a town and a municipality in Gjirokastër County, southern Albania. It was formed at the 2015 local government reform by the merger of the former municipalities Buz, Krahës, Luftinjë, Memaliaj, Memaliaj Fshat and Qesarat, that became municipal units. The seat of the municipality is the town Memaliaj. The population of the former municipality at the 2011 census was 2,647. It is entirely populated by Albanians, both Muslim Bektashis and Orthodox Christians.

References

 
Administrative units of Memaliaj
Municipalities in Gjirokastër County
Towns in Albania